İncilli (also, Indzhilli and Inzhilli) is a village and municipality in the Jalilabad Rayon of Azerbaijan.  It has a population of 608.

References 

Populated places in Jalilabad District (Azerbaijan)